Poltava Kyivska is a railway station in Ukraine city Poltava.

See also
Ukrzaliznytsia - the national railway company of Ukraine
Poltava-South Railway station - is a railway station in Poltava

References

External links

 Poltava Kyivska station on Ukrzaliznytsia site (Ukrainian)
 Timetable of the station Poltava-Kyivs"Ka (Ukraine)

Southern Railways (Ukraine) stations
Railway stations opened in 1901
Railway stations in Poltava Oblast
Railway stations in Poltava